Season twenty-nine of the American reality competition series Dancing with the Stars premiered on September 14, 2020 on ABC. Due to the COVID-19 pandemic, the season was filmed without a live studio audience.

On November 23, The Bachelorette star Kaitlyn Bristowe and Artem Chigvintsev were crowned the champions, while Catfish host Nev Schulman and Jenna Johnson finished in second place, rapper and singer Nelly and Daniella Karagach finished in third place, and actress Justina Machado and Sasha Farber finished in fourth.

Cast

Couples
Continuing from last season, the couples were not announced in advance and were instead revealed on the season premiere. During The Bachelor: Greatest Seasons - Ever!, season 11's Bachelorette, Kaitlyn Bristowe, was announced as the first celebrity participant. On August 24, 2020, it was reported that AJ McLean, member of Backstreet Boys, would be a celebrity participant as well; McLean was later officially revealed on August 27. On August 29, 2020, it was reported that Anne Heche, Jesse Metcalfe, and Vernon Davis would be celebrity participants in the season. The other celebrity participants were revealed on Good Morning America on September 2.

The season's lineup of fourteen professional dancers was announced on Good Morning America on August 18, 2020, with the fifteenth professional announced on August 24. Ten professionals from the previous season returned, along with Sharna Burgess, Artem Chigvintsev, and Keo Motsepe, all of whom last competed in season 27. Two new pros were added: Daniella Karagach, previously a featured dancer, and Britt Stewart, a former troupe member, who is the first black female to become a pro. Lindsay Arnold and Witney Carson did not return as pros this season.

Hosts and judges
On July 13, 2020, it was announced that Tom Bergeron and Erin Andrews would not return as hosts. The next day, it was announced that Tyra Banks was hired as the new host and would also serve as an executive producer. Carrie Ann Inaba and Bruno Tonioli returned as judges for the season.

On September 8, 2020, it was announced that Derek Hough, who appeared as a professional partner in 17 of the show's 29 seasons, would return to the show to fill in for Len Goodman, due to Goodman being unable to travel with COVID-19 pandemic travel restrictions. Goodman still appeared in periodic pre-recorded video segments.

Scoring charts

Notes

 : This was the lowest score of the week.
 : This was the highest score of the week.
 :  This couple finished in first place.
 :  This couple finished in second place.
 :  This couple finished in third place.
 :  This couple finished in fourth place.
 :  This couple withdrew from the competition.
 :  This couple was in the bottom two, but was not eliminated.
 :  This couple was eliminated.

Highest and lowest scoring performances
The best and worst performances in each dance according to the judges' 30-point scale are as follows:

Couples' highest and lowest scoring dances
Scores are based upon a potential 30-point maximum.

Weekly scores
Individual judges' scores in the charts below (given in parentheses) are listed in this order from left to right: Carrie Ann Inaba, Derek Hough, Bruno Tonioli.

Week 1: First Dances
The couples danced the cha-cha-cha, foxtrot, salsa, tango, quickstep, paso doble, or jive. Couples are listed in the order they performed.

For the second time in the show's history, the official partnerships were revealed to the public during the live broadcast.

Week 2: First Elimination
The couples danced one unlearned dance; the rumba, samba, and Viennese waltz were introduced. Couples are listed in the order they performed.

Judges' votes to save
Carrie Ann: Carole & Pasha
Bruno: Charles & Emma
Derek: Carole & Pasha

Week 3: Disney Night
The couples performed one unlearned dance to songs from Disney films; the Argentine tango, Charleston, and waltz were introduced. Couples are listed in the order they performed.

Judges' votes to save
Derek: Anne & Keo
Bruno: Anne & Keo
Carrie Ann: Did not vote, but would have voted to save Anne & Keo

Week 4: Top 13
The couples performed one unlearned dance. Couples are listed in the order they performed.

Judges' votes to save
Carrie Ann: Monica & Val
Derek: Monica & Val
Bruno: Did not vote, but would have voted to save Monica & Val

Week 5: '80s Night
The couples performed one unlearned dance to a song released in the 1980s; contemporary and jazz were introduced. Couples are listed in the order they performed.

Judges' votes to save
Bruno: Vernon & Peta
Carrie Ann: Vernon & Peta
Derek: Did not vote, but would have voted to save Vernon & Peta

Week 6: Top 11
The couples performed one unlearned dance. Couples are listed in the order they performed.

{| class="wikitable sortable" style="text-align:center;"
|-
! scope="col" |Couple
! scope="col" |Scores
! scope="col" |Dance
! scope="col" class="unsortable"|Music
! scope="col" class="unsortable"|Result
|-
! scope="row" | Johnny & Britt
| 22 (7, 8, 7)
| Salsa
| "On the Floor"—Jennifer Lopez feat. Pitbull
| bgcolor=lightblue | Bottom two
|-
! scope="row" | Nev & Jenna
| 26 (9, 9, 8)
| Jazz
| "Good Vibrations"—Marky Mark and the Funky Bunch
| Safe
|-
! scope="row" | Monica & Val
| 27 (9, 9, 9)
| Rumba
| "Have I Told You Lately"—Rod Stewart
| Safe
|-
! scope="row" | Skai & Alan
| 18 (6, 6, 6)
| Cha-cha-cha
| "Say So"—Doja Cat feat. Nicki Minaj| Safe
|-
! scope="row" | Vernon & Peta
| 21 (7, 7, 7)
| Cha-cha-cha
| "Celebration"—Kool & The Gang
| bgcolor=f4c7b8 | Eliminated
|-
! scope="row" | Nelly & Daniella
| 24 (8, 8, 8)
| Viennese waltz
| "Humble and Kind"—Tim McGraw
| Safe
|-
! scope="row" | Jeannie & Brandon
| 25 (8, 8, 9)
| Rumba
|  "You Gotta Be"—Des'ree
| Safe
|-
! scope="row" | AJ & Cheryl
| 27 (9, 9, 9)
| Samba
| "Mi Gente"—J Balvin & Willy William
| Safe
|-
! scope="row" | Chrishell & Gleb
| 24 (8, 8, 8)
| Contemporary 
| "Stars"—Grace Potter & The Nocturnals
| Safe
|-
! scope="row" | Kaitlyn & Artem
| 27 (9, 9, 9)
| Samba
| "Sorry"—Justin Bieber
| Safe
|-
! scope="row" | Justina & Sasha
| 27 (9, 9, 9)
| Viennese waltz
| "She's Always a Woman"—Billy Joel
| Safe
|}
Judges' votes to save
Derek: Johnny & Britt
Carrie Ann: Vernon & Peta
Bruno: Johnny & Britt

Week 7: Villains Night
The couples performed one unlearned dance dressed as villains from a movie or television show. Couples are listed in the order they performed.

Judges' votes to save
Bruno: Jeannie & Brandon
Derek: Monica & Val
Carrie Ann: Jeannie & Brandon

Week 8: Double Elimination Night
The couples performed one unlearned dance and a dance relay with two other couples. The show was originally going to be a double elimination night; however, Jeannie Mai had to withdraw from the competition after being hospitalized for epiglottitis. As a result, only one other couple was eliminated. Couples are listed in the order they performed.

Judges' votes to save  
Carrie Ann: Skai & Alan
Bruno: Skai & Alan
Derek: Did not vote, but would have voted to save Skai & AlanWeek 9: Icons Night
The couples performed one unlearned dance dressed as an icon and participated in paired dance-offs for extra points. Nev & Jenna were immune from the dance-off as a result of their Week 8 performance (and a tie-breaker of higher total season score). Couples are listed in the order they performed.

Judges' votes to save  
Bruno: Johnny & Britt
Derek: AJ & Cheryl
Carrie Ann: Johnny & Britt

Week 10: Semifinals
During the first round, the couples performed a redemption dance to a new song that was coached by one of the four judges. In the second round, they performed one unlearned dance. Two couples were sent home at the end of the night in a double elimination. Couples are listed in the order they performed.

Judges' votes to save
Derek: Justina & Sasha
Carrie Ann: Justina & Sasha
Bruno: Did not vote, but would have voted to save Justina & Sasha''

Week 11: Finale
The couples performed their favorite dance of the season and a freestyle routine. Couples are listed in the order they performed.

Dance chart
The celebrities and professional partners danced one of these routines for each corresponding week:
 Week 1 (First Dances): One unlearned dance
 Week 2 (First Elimination): One unlearned dance
 Week 3 (Disney Night): One unlearned dance
 Week 4 (Top 13): One unlearned dance
 Week 5 ('80s Night): One unlearned dance
 Week 6 (Top 11): One unlearned dance
 Week 7 (Villains Night): One unlearned dance
 Week 8 (Double Elimination Night): One unlearned dance & dance relay
 Week 9 (Icons Night): One unlearned dance & dance-off
 Week 10 (Semifinals): One unlearned dance & redemption dance
 Week 11 (Finale): Favorite dance & freestyle

Notes

 :  This was the highest scoring dance of the week.
 :  This was the lowest scoring dance of the week.
 :  This couple gained bonus points for winning this dance-off.
 :  This couple gained no bonus points for losing this dance-off.
 :  This couple was immune from having to compete in the dance-off.

Ratings

Notes

References

External links

2020 American television seasons
Dancing with the Stars (American TV series)
Television series impacted by the COVID-19 pandemic